Hide N' Seek is a 2012 Malayalam-language drama film directed by Anil. The film stars Mukesh, Divyadarshan, Sonia Mann and Shankar in pivotal roles. Kalidasa Kalakendram, a renowned drama company founded by O. Madhavan, ventured into film production through the film under Kalidasa International Movies. The film is loosely based on the critically acclaimed South Korean romantic drama film 3-Iron by Kim Ki-duk.

Cast
Mukesh as Solomon / Niranjan
 Shalu kurian as mukesh's wife
Divyadarshan as Naveen
Natasha Doshi as Gowri
Shankar as Niranjan
 Maha Gaida ( a Tunisian actress) as Miryam ( an Arabic cinema expert)
 Anil Murali

Production
This was Rajamani's last film as music director. The director of photography of the film was Anandakkuttan and the songs were written by O. N. V. Kurup. The trio died in 3 consecutive days (13 February 2016 - ONV Kurup, 14 February 2016 - Anandakkuttan, 15 February 2016 - Rajamani).

References

External links
 

2012 films
2010s Malayalam-language films
Indian remakes of South Korean films